The Descent from the Cross is the central panel of a triptych painting by Peter Paul Rubens in 1612–1614. It is still in its original place, the Cathedral of Our Lady, Antwerp, Belgium, along with another great altarpiece The Elevation of the Cross. The subject was one Rubens returned to again and again in his career. This particular work was commissioned on September 7, 1611, by the Confraternity of the Arquebusiers, whose Patron Saint was St. Christopher.

Composition
Although essentially Baroque, the oil on panel piece is rooted in the  Venetian tradition, and likely influenced by the work of Daniele da Volterra, Federico Barocci and Cigoli, amongst others. In its composition and use of light, the triptych recalls Caravaggio's Roman period.

Theophile Silvestre wrote, in his "On Rubens' Descent from the Cross – 1868":

“The principal subject is composed of nine figures: at the top of two ladders, workers are lowering the body of Christ with the aid of a shroud which one of them holds in his teeth, the other in the left hand.  Bracing themselves firmly against the arms of the cross, each bends forward to guide the Christ with the hand that is left free while St. John, with one foot on the ladder and his back arched, supports him most energetically.  One of Savior’s feet comes to rest on the beautiful shoulder of the Magdalene, grazing her golden hair.
Joseph of Arimathea and Nicodemus, placed midway on ladders so as to face each other, form, together with the two workmen in the upper part of the picture, a square of vigorous but plebeian figures.
The Virgin, standing at the foot of the sacrificial tree, extends her arms towards her Son; Salome (properly, Mary Cleophas), kneeling, gathers up her robe. On the ground are seen the superscription and a copper basin where the crown of thorns and the nails of the Crucifixion lie in the congealed blood.
The crowd, always elated by the spectacle of torture, has departed from Golgotha as daylight fades.  After the sacrifice of Calvary, as it is called in Scripture, the sad, dark sky is crossed by a light that illumines the shoulders of the workmen, whose bold posture recalls the composition by Daniele da Volterra".

In 1794, Napoleon removed this painting and The Elevation of the Cross  and sent them to the Louvre. After his defeat, they were returned to the cathedral in 1815.

Other versions
In addition to the original work for Antwerp, Rubens painted three or more other versions exploring the same theme.

See also
 The Descent from the Cross (Rubens), for other paintings by Rubens of the same title

Gallery

References

Sources

Paintings by Peter Paul Rubens
Triptychs
1614 paintings
Rubens
Paintings of the Virgin Mary
Paintings depicting Mary Magdalene
Paintings in the Cathedral of Our Lady (Antwerp)